Novara Cathedral ( or Cattedrale di Santa Maria Assunta) is a Roman Catholic cathedral, dedicated to the Assumption of the Virgin Mary, located at the Piazza della Repubblica in Novara, Piedmont, Italy. It is the seat of the Bishop of Novara.

Construction began in the 11th century of the original church on the site, which was consecrated in 1132. It was demolished in the mid-19th century to make way for the current structure, which incorporates from its predecessor the mosaic floor of the presbytery and a chapel dedicated to Saint Syrus. The present Neo-Classical cathedral was designed by the architect Alessandro Antonelli and was built between 1863 and 1869. It has recently undergone a 12-year-long restoration project which was completed in November 2009.

The baptistry, a separate structure although functionally part of the cathedral, is a Palaeo-Christian building dating from the 4th-5th centuries.

The composers Pietro Generali, in the years leading up to his death in 1832, and Antonio Cagnoni, from 1879 to 1888, served as the maestri di cappella here.

Notes

Sources
Novara.com: Novara Cathedral

Further reading
 Perotti, Mario, 1995: Il Duomo di Novara. Guido storico-artistica. Novara: Istituto geografico De Agostini-Interlinea

Cathedral
Neoclassical architecture in Piedmont
Cathedrals in Piedmont
Churches in the province of Novara
19th-century Roman Catholic church buildings in Italy
Roman Catholic cathedrals in Italy
Roman Catholic churches completed in 1869
Neoclassical church buildings in Italy